"I Love" is a song by American rapper Joyner Lucas, released on October 17, 2018 alongside its music video. Written by Lucas and its producer TheSkyBeats, it served as the lead single of his debut studio album ADHD (2020).

Background and composition 
On October 17, 2018, Joyner Lucas premiered the song on Zane Lowe's Beats 1 show. On an "up-tempo instrumental", Lucas raps that he is not a person to be messed with on the track.

Charts

Certifications

References 

2020 singles
2020 songs
Atlantic Records singles
Joyner Lucas songs
Songs written by Joyner Lucas